Deitre Collins (born March 3, 1962) is an American volleyball player. She competed in the women's tournament at the 1988 Summer Olympics. While at Hawai'i, she won the Broderick Award (now the Honda Sports Award) as the nation's top collegiate volleyball player in both 1983 and 1984.

References

External links
 

1962 births
Living people
American women's volleyball players
Olympic volleyball players of the United States
Volleyball players at the 1988 Summer Olympics
Place of birth missing (living people)
21st-century American women
Hawaii Rainbow Wahine volleyball players
Pan American Games medalists in volleyball
Pan American Games bronze medalists for the United States
Medalists at the 1987 Pan American Games